Cuevas de Sorbas are the tourist gypsum caves in Sorbas in Almeria, Spain. The formations are 6 million years old and consist of karst in gypsum rock.

External links
 Cuevas de Sorbas - Visitas Guiadas
 Karst en Yesos de Sorbas

:es:Karst en Yesos de Sorbas

Show caves in Spain
Gypsum caves
Caves of Andalusia